Grange-over-Sands is a civil parish in the South Lakeland District of Cumbria, England.  It contains 51 listed buildings that are recorded in the National Heritage List for England.  Of these, one is listed at Grade II*, the middle of the three grades, and the others are at Grade II, the lowest grade.  The major settlement in the parish is the town of Grange-over-Sands, which developed as a holiday resort after the arrival of the Furness Railway in 1857.  Elsewhere the parish contains the villages of Kents Bank and Lindale, and the surrounding countryside.  Inside the town the listed buildings include houses, shops, a café, hotels, churches, a railway station, public buildings, a bank, a bandstand, a clock tower, and a disused lido.  Outside the town are farmhouses and farm buildings, a country house and associated structures, and a limekiln.


Key

Buildings

Notes and references

Notes

Citations

Sources

Lists of listed buildings in Cumbria
Grange-over-Sands